The Centre de services scolaire de Laval (CSSDL) is a French-language school service centre in the Canadian province of Quebec. It is headquartered in Laval. As of 2011, the board of the predecessor, Commission scolaire de Laval, managed fifty-two primary schools, fourteen secondary schools, eight professional development centres, and three adult education centres in Laval.

Like all school boards in Quebec, the commission is overseen by a board of elected trustees.

Schools

Secondary schools

 École secondaire Alphonse-Desjardins
 École secondaire Curé-Antoine-Labelle
 École secondaire De la Mosaïque
 École secondaire Georges-Vanier
 École secondaire Horizon Jeunesse
 École secondaire Jean-Piaget
 École secondaire L'Odyssée-des-Jeunes
 École secondaire Leblanc
 École secondaire Mont-de-La Salle
 École secondaire Poly-Jeunesse
 École secondaire Saint-Martin
 École secondaire Saint-Maxime
 Centre de qualification professionnelle et d'entrepreneuriat de Laval
 École d'éducation internationale de Laval (ÉÉIL)

Primary schools

Alfred-Pellan
Charles-Bruneau
Coeur-Soleil
Coursol
Demers
De l'Arc-en-ciel
Des Cardinaux
Des Cèdres
Des Ormeaux
Du Bois-Joli
Du Parc
De l'Avenir
De l'Équinoxe
Fleur-de-Vie
Fleur-Soleil
Hébert
J.-Jean-Joubert
Jean-Lemonde
Jean-XXIII
L'Aquarelle
L'Envolée
L'Escale
L'Harmonie
L'Orée-des-Bois
La Source
Le Baluchon
Le Petit-Prince
Le Sentier
Le Tandem
Léon-Guilbault
Les Explorateurs
Les Quatre-Vents / Monseigneur-Laval
Les Trois-Soleils 
Marc-Aurèle-Fortin
Marcel-Vaillancourt
Notre-Dame-du-Sourire
Paul-Comtois
Paul-VI
Pépin
Père-Vimont
Pierre-Laporte
Raymond 
Saint-François
Saint-Gilles 
Saint-Julien
Saint-Norbert
Saint-Paul
Sainte-Béatrice
Sainte-Dorothée
Sainte-Marguerite
Simon-Vanier
Val-des-Arbres
Villemaire

Alternative schools:
 L'Envol

Related pages
Sir Wilfrid Laurier School Board (area Anglophone school board)

References

External links
 Commission scolaire de Laval 

School districts in Quebec
Education in Laval, Quebec